Jingdong Yi Autonomous County is an autonomous county in the west-central part of Yunnan Province, China. It is the northernmost county-level division of the prefecture-level city of Pu'er.

Administrative divisions
In the present, Jingdong Yi Autonomous County has 10 towns and 3 townships.
10 towns

3 townships
 Mandeng
 Longjie
 Linjie

Ethnic groups
The Hani of Jingdong (autonym: Kaduo 卡多) numbered 10,861 individuals as of 1990 and live primarily in Wenjing , Zhehou , and Huashan  townships.

The Jingdong County Ethnic Gazetteer  (2012:209) reports that are about 200 ethnic Bulang in Manbeng Village , Dachaoshandong Town .

According to the Jingdong County Gazetteer (1994:519), ethnic Yao numbered 3,889 individuals in 1990, and lived mainly in Chaqing  and Dasongshu  of Taizhong . Yao language speakers, known as the Lewu Yao , were found in Puya Village , Chaqing Township  (Jingdong County Ethnic Gazetteer 2012:144). The Jingdong County Ethnic Gazetteer (2012) reports that the Lewu language is now extinct.

Fauna
Frog species in Jingdong County include:
Family Megophryidae
Oreolalax granulosus (endemic to the Ailao Mountains)
Oreolalax jingdongensis (endemic to the Ailao Mountains)
Leptolalax alpinus (endemic)
Xenophrys wuliangshanensis (type locality)
Xenophrys glandulosa (type locality)
Xenophrys jingdongensis (type locality)
Xenophrys gigantica
Leptobrachium ailaonicum (type locality)
Family Ranidae
Nanorana bourreti
Odorrana jingdongensis (type locality)

Climate

References

Jingdong County Ethnic Gazetteer Editorial Committee (ed). 2012. Jingdong County Ethnic Gazetteer 景东彝族自治县民族志. Kunming: Yunnan People's Press 云南民族出版社.
Jingdong County Gazetteer Editorial Committee (ed). 1994. Jingdong County Gazetteer 景东彝族自治县志. Chengdu: Sichuan Reference Book Press 四川辞书出版社.

External links
Jingdong County Official Site

 
County-level divisions of Pu'er City
Yi autonomous counties